A&D may refer to:

Akrotiri and Dhekelia, two UK-administered areas on the island of Cyprus that comprise the Sovereign Base Areas military bases of the United Kingdom
A&D Company, Limited, a Japanese manufacturer of medical equipment and laboratory testing equipment; it refers to "analog and digital"
Angels & Demons, a book by American author Dan Brown
Aerospace & Defense, the defense industry

See also
A+D (disambiguation)